Maoritomella torquatella is an extinct species of sea snail, a marine gastropod mollusk in the family Borsoniidae.

Description

Distribution
This extinct marine species from the Upper Cenozoic was found in New Zealand.

References

 Maxwell, P.A. (2009). Cenozoic Mollusca. pp. 232–254 in Gordon, D.P. (ed.) New Zealand inventory of biodiversity. Volume one. Kingdom Animalia: Radiata, Lophotrochozoa, Deuterostomia. Canterbury University Press, Christchurch.

torquatella
Gastropods of New Zealand
Extinct animals of New Zealand
Cenozoic gastropods
Gastropods described in 1931